Chłopówko  is a settlement in the administrative district of Gmina Myślibórz, which is within Myślibórz County, West Pomeranian Voivodeship, in north-western Poland.

References

Villages in Myślibórz County